Aneta Konieczek (born 8 June 1997) is a Polish Olympic steeplechaser.

Career
In 2021, Konieczek won the gold medal at the Polish Seniors Athletics Championships in the 3000 m steeplechase race with a time of 9: 25.98, which ensured her participation in the 2020 Summer Olympics in Tokyo. That is also a 3rd result in a Polish history. She is a PAC-12 champion and a meet record holder. In 2021 she got All-American in an indoor mile. 
Her sister Alicja Konieczek took second place at the Polish Senior Championships and also achieved the Olympic standard time.

Konieczek ran the Athletics at the 2020 Summer Olympics – Women's 3000 metres steeplechase and finished twelfth in heat two in a time of 10.07:25.

Personal life
She studied at Western Colorado University and at the University of Oregon. Her brother Dawid has competed in athletics at national level in Poland and university level in the US, and her sister Alicja is a fellow Olympic steeplechaser.

References

External links
 
 
 

1997 births
Living people
Polish female steeplechase runners
Olympic athletes of Poland
Athletes (track and field) at the 2020 Summer Olympics
Athletes (track and field) at the 2014 Summer Youth Olympics
Oregon Ducks women's cross country runners
Oregon Ducks women's track and field athletes